Amelie or The Time to Love is a 1961 French drama film directed by Michel Drach. It was entered into the 11th Berlin International Film Festival.

Cast
 Marie-José Nat - Amélie
 Jean Sorel - Alain
 Clotilde Joano - Fanny
 Roger Van Mullem - Monsieur Boule
 Pascale de Boysson - La servante des Boule
 Francis Dumoulino - Monsieur Carnal
 Martine Vatel - La servante des Rueil
 Monique Le Porrier - Clara
 Sacha Briquet - Hubert
 Jean Babilée - Pierre
 Louise de Vilmorin - Loyse
 Sophie Daumier - Emmannuelle

References

External links

1961 films
1960s French-language films
1961 drama films
French black-and-white films
Films directed by Michel Drach
1960s French films